Palestine Stereo is a 2013 Palestinian drama film written and directed by Rashid Masharawi. It was screened in the Contemporary World Cinema section at the 2013 Toronto International Film Festival.

Cast
 Mahmud Abu-Jazi
 Salah Hannoun
 Assem Zoubi

References

External links
 

2013 films
2013 drama films
Palestinian drama films
2010s Arabic-language films
Films directed by Rashid Masharawi